SM Shahjada is a Bangladesh Awami League politician and the incumbent Jatiya Sangsad member representing the Patuakhali-3 constituency.

Career
Shahjada was elected to parliament from Patuakhali-3 as a Bangladesh Awami League candidate 30 December 2018. His candidacy was controversial as his maternal uncle, KM Nurul Huda, was the head of the Bangladesh Election Commission overseeing the General Elections.

References

Living people
People from Patuakhali district
Awami League politicians
11th Jatiya Sangsad members
Year of birth missing (living people)
Place of birth missing (living people)